Lake Tahoe inflow streams contribute  of the  of water that flows through Lake Tahoe every year. The list, below, groups rivers and creeks that flow into the lake by their locations on the north, east, south and west shores, in a clockwise order.  Sub-tributaries are listed under the tributaries they feed, sorted by the elevation of the confluence so that tributaries entering nearest Lake Tahoe appear first.

See also
 List of rivers of California
 List of rivers of Nevada
 List of rivers of the Great Basin

References

.Inflow streams

Lake Tahoe inflow streams
Lake Tahoe inflow streams
+Lake Tahoe
Lake Tahoe inflow streams
Lake Tahoe
Lake Tahoe
Lake Tahoe
Rivers of the Sierra Nevada (United States)